The Socialist International (SI) is a political international or worldwide organisation of political parties which seek to establish democratic socialism. It consists mostly of social-democratic, socialist and labour political parties and organisations. 

Although formed in 1951 as a successor to the Labour and Socialist International, it has antecedents in the late 19th century. The organisation currently includes 132 member parties and organisations from over 100 countries. Its members have governed in many countries, including most of Europe. In 2013, a schism in the SI led to the establishment of the Progressive Alliance.

The current secretary general of the SI is Benedicta Lasi (Ghana) and the current president of the SI is the prime minister of Spain, Pedro Sánchez, both of whom were elected at the last SI Congress held in Madrid, Spain, in November 2022.

History

First and Second Internationals (1864–1916)
The International Workingmen's Association, also known as the First International, was the first international body to bring together organisations representing the working class. It was formed in London on 28 September 1864 by socialist, communist and anarchist political groups and trade unions. Tensions between moderates and revolutionaries led to its dissolution in 1876 in Philadelphia.

The Second International was formed in Paris on 14 July 1889 as an association of the socialist parties. Differences over World War I led to the Second International being dissolved in 1916.

Labour and Socialist International (1919–1940)
The International Socialist Commission (ISC), also known as the Berne International, was formed in February 1919 at a meeting in Bern by parties that wanted to resurrect the Second International. In March 1919, Communist parties formed the Communist International ("Comintern"), the Third International, at a meeting in Moscow.

Some parties did not want to be a part of the resurrected Second International (ISC) or Comintern. They formed the International Working Union of Socialist Parties (IWUSP, also known as Vienna International, Vienna Union, or Two-and-a-Half International) on 27 February 1921 at a conference in Vienna. The ISC and the IWUSP joined to form the Labour and Socialist International (LSI) in May 1923 at a meeting in Hamburg. The rise of Nazism and the start of World War II led to the dissolution of the LSI in 1940.

Socialist International (1951–present)
The Socialist International was formed in Frankfurt in July 1951 as a successor to the LSI.

During the post-World War II period, the SI aided social democratic parties in re-establishing themselves when dictatorship gave way to democracy in Portugal (1974) and Spain (1975). Until its 1976 Geneva Congress, the SI had few members outside Europe and no formal involvement with Latin America. In the 1980s, most SI parties gave their backing to the Nicaraguan Sandinistas (FSLN), whose democratically elected left-wing government was subject to a campaign to overthrow it backed by the United States, which culminated in the Iran–Contra affair after the Reagan administration covertly continued US support for the Contras after such support was banned by Congress.

In the late 1970s and in the 1980s the SI had extensive contacts and discussion with the two leading powers of the Cold War period, the United States and the Soviet Union, on issues concerning East–West relations and arms control. The SI supported détente and disarmament agreements, such as SALT II, START and INF. They had several meetings and discussion in Washington, D.C. with President Jimmy Carter and Vice-President George Bush and in Moscow with Secretaries General Leonid Brezhnev and Mikhail Gorbachev. The SI's delegations to these discussions were led by the Finnish Prime Minister Kalevi Sorsa.

Since then, the SI has admitted as members an increasing number of parties and organisations from Africa, Asia, Europe and Latin America (see below for current list).

Following the Tunisian Revolution, the Constitutional Democratic Rally was expelled from the SI in January 2011; later that month the Egyptian National Democratic Party was also expelled; and as a result of the 2010–2011 Ivorian crisis, the Ivorian Popular Front was expelled in March 2011, in accordance with section 7.1 of the statutes of the Socialist International. These decisions were approved at the subsequent SI Congress in Cape Town in 2012 in line with section 5.1.3 of the statutes.

Progressive Alliance split (2013)
On 22 May 2013 the SPD along with some other current and former member parties of the SI founded a rival international network of social-democratic parties known as the Progressive Alliance, citing the perceived undemocratic and outmoded nature of the SI, as well as the Socialist International's admittance and continuing inclusion of undemocratic political movements into the organization.

After the 2012 Congress, the SI underwent major changes as many of the large European parties allowed their membership to lapse - for example the Social Democratic Party of Germany (SPD) and the Swedish Social Democratic Labour Party - or downgraded their membership to observer status - for example, the British Labour Party and the Norwegian Labour Party (DNA). These parties now concentrate their international links on the Progressive Alliance, with the SI's focus now increasingly being on the global south.

Relationship with Latin America
For a long time, the Socialist International remained distant from Latin America, considering the region as a zone of influence of the United States. For example, it did not denounce the coup d'état against Socialist President Jacobo Árbenz in Guatemala in 1954 or the invasion of the Dominican Republic by the United States in 1965. It was not until the 1973 Chilean coup d'état that "a world we did not know" was discovered explained Antoine Blanca, a diplomat for the French PS. According to him, solidarity with the Chilean left was "the first challenge worthy of the name, against Washington, of an International which, until then, had done everything to appear subject to American strategy and NATO". Subsequently, notably under the leadership of François Mitterrand, the SI supported the Sandinistas in Nicaragua and other movements in El Salvador, Guatemala and Honduras in their struggle against US-supported dictatorships.

In the 1990s, it was joined by non-socialist parties that took note of the economic power of the European countries governed or to be governed by their partners across the Atlantic and calculated the benefits they could derive from it. During this period, "the socialist international works in a clientist way; some parties come here to rub shoulders with Europeans as if they were in the upper class," says Porfirio Muñoz Ledo, one of the representatives of the Party of the Democratic Revolution (Mexico) at the SI. It is home to "the very centrist Argentinean Radical Civic Union (UCR); the Mexican Institutional Revolutionary Party (PRI), which was not very democratically in power for seventy years; the Colombian Liberal Party—under whose governments the left-wing formation Patriotic Union (1986–1990) was exterminated—introduced the neoliberal model (1990–1994) and to which, until 2002, Álvaro Uribe will belong". In the following decade, many left-wing parties that came to power (in Brazil, Venezuela, Bolivia, Ecuador and El Salvador) preferred to keep their distance from the SI.

Logo
The logo is the fist and rose, based on the 1977 design by José María Cruz Novillo for the Spanish Socialist Workers' Party, itself a variant of the logo of the French Socialist Party. Variants of the emblem are or were used by several SI member parties.

Presidents, honorary presidents and secretaries general

Presidents
, there have been a total of 9 Socialist International presidents.

Honorary presidents
Current and honorary presidents include:
Pierre Mauroy, former president of the SI
Mustapha Ben Jafar, Tunisia
Leonel Brizola, Brazil
Rubén Berríos, Puerto Rico
Philippe Busquin, Belgium
Cuauhtémoc Cárdenas, Mexico
Mohamed El Yazghi, Morocco
Alan García, Peru
Anita Gradin, Sweden
Elazar Granot, Israel
Tarja Halonen, Finland
Mahamadou Issoufou, Niger
Anker Jørgensen, Denmark
Lionel Jospin, France
Neil Kinnock, United Kingdom
Horacio Serpa, Colombia
Enrique Silva Cimma, Chile
Mário Soares, Portugal
Hans-Jochen Vogel, Germany

Secretaries general
Julius Braunthal, Austria (1951–1956)
Bjarne Braatoy, Norway (1956–1957)
Albert Carthy, United Kingdom (1957–1969)
Hans Janitschek, Austria (1969–1976)
Bernt Carlsson, Sweden (1976–1983)
Pentti Väänänen, Finland (1983–1989)
Luis Ayala, Chile (1989–2022)
Benedicta Lasi, Ghana (2022-present)

Summits
 1951 (Ist): Frankfurt, West Germany.
 1952 (IInd): Milan, Italy.
 1953 (IIIrd): Stockholm, Sweden.
 1955 (IVth): London, United Kingdom.
 1957 (Vth): Vienna, Austria.
 1959 (VIth): Hamburg, West Germany.
 1961 (VIIth): Rome, Italy.
 1963 (VIIIth): Amsterdam, Netherlands.
 1964 (IXth): Brussels, Belgium.
 1966 (Xth): Stockholm, Sweden.
 1969 (XIth): Eastbourne, United Kingdom.
 1972 (XIIth): Vienna, Austria (2nd time).
 1976 (XIIIth): Geneva, Switzerland.
 1978 (XIVth): Vancouver, Canada.
 1980 (XVth): Madrid, Spain.
 1983 (XVIth): Albufeira, Portugal.
 1986 (XVIIth): Lima, Peru.
 1989 (XVIIIth): Stockholm, Sweden (2nd time).
 1992 (XIXth): Berlin, Germany.
 1996 (XXth): New York City, United States.
 1999 (XXIst): Paris, France.
 2003 (XXIInd): São Paulo, Brazil.
 2008 (XXIIIrd): Athens, Greece.
 2012 (XXIVth): Cape Town, South Africa.
 2017 (XXVth): Cartagena, Colombia.
 2022 (XXVIth): Madrid, Spain (2nd time).

Members

Full members
There are 92 full members:

Consultative parties
There are 19 consultative parties:

Observer parties
There are eight observer parties:

Former members

Fraternal organisations
 International Falcon Movement – Socialist Educational International
 Socialist International Women

Associated organisations

See also

 French Section of the Workers' International
 Reformism

Notes

References

Further reading
 The Socialist International by Nikolai Sibilev, 1984.
 Social Democracy and Southern Africa by Vladimir Shubin (pseudonym of Vladimir Bushin), 1989.
 Julius Braunthal, "The Rebirth of Social Democracy," Foreign Affairs, vol. 27, no. 4 (July 1949), pp. 586–600. In JSTOR
 Pentti Vaananen, The Rose and the Fist, SYS Print, 2014, pp. 50–230.

External links
 

 
History of socialism
Organisations based in the London Borough of Lambeth
Political parties established in 1951
Political organisations based in London
Political internationals
Social democracy
Democratic socialism
International Socialist Organisations

1951 establishments in Germany